Woodlawn Cemetery is a cemetery located in Saskatoon, Saskatchewan, Canada. Located in the cemetery is the Next of Kin Memorial Avenue, a National Historic Site of Canada, that is dedicated to all those who served with Canada's armed forces.

The cemetery was established in 1905 as the St. Paul's Roman Catholic Cemetery, with the city taking over responsibility in 1918. Prior to that point in time either the Nutana Pioneer Cemetery in Nutana or the Summerdale Cemetery in the town of Smithville (now annexed into the Blairmore SDA) was used.

The cemetery has been divided into the following sections to specific customs and religious traditions or special affiliations:
 Children
 Infants
 Cremated Remains
 University of Saskatchewan
 Field of Honour (Military)
 Flat Marker
 Upright Monument
 Spiritual Assembly of the Baha'i
 Catholic
 Chinese
 Greek
 Orthodox
 Islamic Ismalian
 Jewish
 Non-Denominational

Block 55 contains the war graves of 107 Commonwealth service personnel of the First and Second World Wars.

Notable burials 
 William Harvey Clare, mayor of Saskatoon
 James Clinkskill, mayor of Saskatoon
 Gerry Couture, NHL hockey player
 Norman James Boswell Fowler, NHL hockey player
 Lyell Gustin, pianist, music educator, and adjudicator
 John W. Hair, mayor of Saskatoon
 William Hopkins, mayor of Saskatoon
 Malcolm Scarth Halsetter Isbister, mayor of Saskatoon
 James Lloyd Klein, NHL hockey player
 Frank MacMillan, Conservative Politician
 Angus W. MacPherson, mayor of Saskatoon
 Charlie Mason, NHL hockey player
 John Sproule Mills, mayor of Saskatoon
 George Wesley Norman, mayor of Saskatoon
 Robert Pitford Pinder, mayor of Saskatoon
 Herbert Sidney Sears, mayor of Saskatoon
 Richard St. Barbe Baker, environmentalist
 Joseph Edwin Underwood, mayor of Saskatoon
 James Robert Wilson, mayor of Saskatoon
 Russell Wilson, mayor of Saskatoon
 Alexander MacGillivray Young, mayor of Saskatoon, Member of the House of Commons of Canada
 Percy Klaehn, mayor of Saskatoon

References

Cemeteries in Saskatchewan
Buildings and structures in Saskatoon